Hobart is an unincorporated community in Ascension Parish, Louisiana, United States, located in the vicinity of Prairieville. Hobart is located at State Highway 42. Barack Obama visited Hobart on October 14, 2013.

References

Unincorporated communities in Ascension Parish, Louisiana
Unincorporated communities in Louisiana